The 2007 NCAA Division II men's basketball tournament was the 51st annual single-elimination tournament to determine the national champion of men's NCAA Division II college basketball in the United States.

Officially culminating the 2006–07 NCAA Division II men's basketball season, the tournament featured sixty-four teams from around the country.

The Elite Eight, national semifinals, and championship were again played at the MassMutual Center in Springfield, Massachusetts.

Barton (31–5) defeated defending champions Winona State in the final, 77–75, to win their first Division II national championship. 

The Bulldogs were coached by Ron Lievense. Barton's Anthony Atkinson was the Most Outstanding Player.

Regionals

Northeast - Waltham, Massachusetts 
Location: Dana Center Host: Bentley College

North Central - Winona, Minnesota 
Location: McCown Gymnasium Host: Winona State University

South - Montevallo, Alabama 
Location: People's Bank and Trust Arena Host: University of Montevallo

South Central - Warrensburg, Missouri 
Location: UCM Fieldhouse Host: Central Missouri State University

East - Wilson, North Carolina 
Location: Wilson Gym Host: Barton College

Great Lakes - Findlay, Ohio 
Location: Houdeshell Court at Croy Gymnasium Host: University of Findlay

South Atlantic - Augusta, Georgia 
Location: Christenberry Fieldhouse Host: Augusta State University

West - Arcata, California 
Location: East Gym Host: Humboldt State University

Elite Eight–Springfield, Massachusetts
Location: MassMutual Center Hosts: American International College and Naismith Memorial Basketball Hall of Fame

All-tournament team
 Anthony Atkinson, Barton (MOP)
 Jonte Flowers, Winona State
 Zack Malvik, Winona State
 John Smith, Winona State
 Zack Wright, Central Missouri

See also
2007 NCAA Division I men's basketball tournament
2007 NCAA Division III men's basketball tournament

References
 2007 NCAA Division II men's basketball tournament jonfmorse.com

 NCAA Division II men's basketball tournament Results

NCAA Division II men's basketball tournament
NCAA Division II basketball tournament
NCAA Division II basketball tournament